Havlíčkův Brod Airport  is a public aerodrome and no public international airport with civil traffic. The airport is plentifully used for sport flying and sightseeing flights above the Bohemian-Moravian Highlands.

References

External links

Airports in the Czech Republic
Buildings and structures in Havlíčkův Brod
1935 establishments in Czechoslovakia
Airports established in 1935
20th-century architecture in the Czech Republic